Feeling Your UFO is a mini-album (or EP) by the Japanese rock band Ling tosite Sigure, released between their 1st and 2nd full-length albums on July 19, 2006.

Track listing
All tracks written and composed by TK.

References

External links 
 Ling tosite sigure discography 

2006 EPs
Ling Tosite Sigure albums